The 1937 Columbia Lions football team was an American football team that represented Columbia University as an independent during the 1937 college football season. In his eighth season, head coach Lou Little led the team to a 2–5–2 record, though the Lions were only outscored  by opponents.  

The team played its home games at Baker Field in Upper Manhattan.

Schedule

References

Columbia
Columbia Lions football seasons
Columbia Lions football